Les Appalaches ( Municipalité régionale de comté des Appalaches) is a regional county municipality (RCM) in the Chaudière-Appalaches region in southeastern Quebec, Canada.  It was established in 1982 from parts of the historic counties of Beauce, Frontenac, Mégantic, and Wolfe. The county seat and largest city is Thetford Mines.

The name of the RCM is linked to its location in the Appalachian Mountains with Mounts Adstock, Caribou, Oak, and Saint-Adrien being the highest. Until 2008, it was known as L'Amiante Regional County Municipality, because of the importance of asbestos mining in the region (amiante is French for "asbestos").

Subdivisions
There are 19 subdivisions within the RCM:

Cities & Towns (2)
 Disraeli
 Thetford Mines

Municipalities (13)
 Adstock
 Beaulac-Garthby
 East Broughton
 Irlande
 Kinnear's Mills
 Saint-Adrien-d'Irlande
 Sainte-Clotilde-de-Beauce
 Saint-Fortunat
 Saint-Jacques-de-Leeds
 Saint-Jean-de-Brébeuf
 Saint-Joseph-de-Coleraine
 Saint-Julien
 Saint-Pierre-de-Broughton

Parishes (4)
 Disraeli
 Sacré-Coeur-de-Jésus
 Sainte-Praxède
 Saint-Jacques-le-Majeur-de-Wolfestown

Demographics

Language
Mother tongue from Canada 2016 Census

Transportation

Access Routes
Highways and numbered routes that run through the municipality, including external routes that start or finish at the county border:

 Autoroutes
 None

 Principal Highways
 
 
 

 Secondary Highways
 
 
 
 
 

 External Routes
 None

Attractions
 Chemins Craig and Gosford Historic Route
 Serpentine-de-Coleraine Ecological Reserve (Saint-Joseph-de-Coleraine)
 Frontenac National Park (Adstock)
 Heritage Kinnear's Mills (Kinnear's Mills)
 Mount Adstock (Adstock)
 Musée minéralogique et minier de Thetford Mines (Thetford Mines)
 Thetford Mines Bike Path (Thetford Mines)

See also
 List of regional county municipalities and equivalent territories in Quebec

References

Commission de toponymie du Québec

Regional county municipalities in Chaudière-Appalaches
Census divisions of Quebec